Satellite Town is a town and a union council of Chiniot district in Punjab, Pakistan. It is located in the Chiniot city. According to census 1998 its population is 22,840.

Facilities
Election commission office, Sui Gas office, Post Office, Passport Office, Hockey Ground, Excise and taxation office, Zakat distribution office, Deaf & Dumb School are located in Satellite Town.

References 

Populated places in Chiniot District